Cobra King is an American Sherman tank of World War II. During the Battle of the Bulge in December 1944, the Germans had attacked a weakly defended section of the Allied line and surrounded American forces in the town of Bastogne. Cobra King was the first tank to enter the Bastogne perimeter in relief of the besieged American 101st Airborne Division.

War service
Cobra King was first used in combat in 1944. It was knocked out during fighting in France during November 1944, and later repaired and re-issued.

In late 1944 the tank was assigned to Company C of the 37th Tank Battalion of the American 4th Armored Division, which was the spearhead of General Patton's Third Army racing toward Bastogne. The 37th was then under the command of Creighton Abrams, later commander of American forces in the Vietnam War, Chief of Staff of the United States Army, and namesake of the M1 Abrams tank. Cobra King's commander was Lieutenant Charles Boggess, heading a crew of Hubert S. Smith (driver), Harold Hafner (co-driver), Milton Dickerman (gunner), and James G. Murphy (loader). Boggess had replaced the tank's previous commander, Charles Trover, who had been killed by a sniper on 23 December while he was standing in the turret.

On December 26, 1944, Cobra King led its company in intense fighting in the village of Assenois. After fighting through the town, it made contact with the American 326th Airborne Engineer Battalion, at 
4:50pm. With this, the German encirclement was finally  broken, although it took several more days until supply lines to the south were firmly established.

Shortly after the Battle of the Bulge Cobra King was rearmed with a 76 mm gun then fought on into Germany. Within a short time in the field, the chalk legend "First In Bastogne" was weathered off, and it later gained a new crew, and the identity and historic status of the tank was largely lost.

Cobra King was part of Task Force Baum, Patton's controversial and failed attempt to liberate the prison camp Oflag XIII-B. All the tanks of the task force were destroyed; according to Army historian Patrick R. Jennings, Cobra King was hit by a Panzerfaust round that penetrated  its armor and started a fire in bow machine gun ammunition storage, the tank was abandoned on March 27, 1945. No crewmen were killed.

After the war

After the war, the shell-pitted and gutted Cobra King was recovered from the battlefield and displayed as a symbolic "gate guard" at McKee Barracks in Crailsheim, Germany (1957-1967);  at Ferris Barracks in Erlangen, Germany 1967-1993;  and, later, Rose Barracks in Vilseck, Germany 1993-2008. 

As Army historians slowly investigated the backstories of old WWII tanks remaining in Europe, Army chaplain Keith Goode began to suspect that the anonymous tank rusting at Rose Barracks was Cobra King. In 2008, Army historians concluded that it indeed was. Cobra King had been built at the Fisher Tank Arsenal at Flint, Michigan. Only 254 Jumbos were built; each was given a serial number, and the Army registration numbers assigned to the vehicles were also in sequential order. This allowed Army historians to confirm a direct match (the Cobra King name was applied to the side of the hull with adhesive-backed lettering and was always visible through layers of paint. Many of the surviving M4A3E2 Jumbo Shermans had been given the Cobra King name in the decades after World War II) with the two sets of numbers, and identify Cobra King.

In July 2009, the United States Army Center of Military History shipped Cobra King from Germany to the Patton Museum at Fort Knox for restoration. Restoration work included the difficult task of finding parts from original sources, such as an original Ford V-8 engine, 75mm gun, and tracks identical to Cobra King's originals. The exterior was restored, but no attempt was made to render the tank driveable and only minimally clean and restore the fire damaged interior (dozens of cartridge cases and spent bullets that were cooked off in the fire were found under the turret basket).

On August 3, 2017, Cobra King was installed at the new National Museum of the United States Army at Fort Belvoir, twenty miles south of Washington, D. C.

Notes

Charles Lemons, Curator of the Patton Museum of Cavalry and Armor when the vehicle arrived at Fort Knox, had conversations with both CPT Baum and COL James Leach (who was Company Commander of Co. B, 37th Tank Bn at the time of the Raid).  CPT Baum, when asked about tank types simply stated that he was an infantryman and his column included "Big Tanks and Little Tanks".  COL Leach stated that C Company was selected because it had the most tanks operational and that the Sherman Jumbo was never considered too slow for combat operations and no commander in his right mind would leave a functional tank behind, especially when his company was short of vehicles.

References

Bibliography

 
 
 
 
 
 
 
 
 
 
 
 
 
 
 

Individual tanks
Battle of the Bulge
M4 Sherman tanks